Bokermannohyla izecksohni, also known as Izecksohn's treefrog, is a species of frog in the family Hylidae. It is endemic to São Paulo state, Brazil. It was already considered possibly extinct in 2004, but three living frogs were discovered in 2005–2006.

Etymology
The specific name izecksohni honours Eugênio Izecksohn, a Brazilian herpetologist.

Habitat and conservation

Breeding takes place in temporary ponds. It is threatened by habitat loss: the type locality has already been destroyed by agriculture and human settlement. However, the discovery of two new populations in 2005–2006 suggested that it is not quite as threatened as previously feared; one of them is in the Serra do Mar State Park where it has already been recorded later.

References

Bokermannohyla
Amphibians of Brazil
Endemic fauna of Brazil
Amphibians described in 1979
Taxa named by Ulisses Caramaschi
Taxonomy articles created by Polbot